Tulce  is a village in the administrative district of Gmina Kleszczewo, within Poznań County, Greater Poland Voivodeship, in west-central Poland. There is the church of Virgin Mary, founded in first half of the 13th century by noble family Łodzia Coat of Arms.

The village has a population of 1,842.

References

Tulce